Tess or TESS may refer to:

Music
 Tess (band), a Spanish pop band active from 2000 to 2005
 TESS (musician), a UK musician

Film and theatre
 Tess (1979 film), a 1979 film adaptation of Tess of the d'Urbervilles
 Tess (2016 film), a South African production
 Tess (play), a stage adaptation of Tess of the d'Urbervilles featuring Tanya Franks

Science and technology
 Trademark Electronic Search System, a service of the U.S. Patent and Trademark Office
 Transiting Exoplanet Survey Satellite, a space telescope designed to search for extra-solar planets
 Ethinylestradiol/cyproterone acetate, a birth control pill
 Typhoon Tess (disambiguation)

Other uses
 Tess (given name)
 Nikolay Tess (1921–2006), member of the Soviet Ministry for State Security, convicted in Latvia of mass deportations of Latvians in the 1940s

See also
 TES (disambiguation)